Tastemaker is the debut EP by rapper Pittsburgh Slim. It was released by Def Jam Records on December 4, 2007.

Track listing
 "Pittsburgh Slim"
 "Superstar Extraordinaire"
 "My Flashy World"
 "Girls Kiss Girls"
 "Sunrays"
 "Kiss and Tell"
 "Toy"
 "Girls Kiss Girls (Dirty Version)"

References

Albums produced by Ski Beatz
2007 debut EPs
Def Jam Recordings EPs